Clea Helen D'Etienne DuVall (born September 25, 1977) is an American actress, writer, producer, and director. She is known for her appearances in the films The Faculty (1998), She's All That; But I'm a Cheerleader; Girl, Interrupted (all 1999); Identity, 21 Grams (both 2003), The Grudge (2004), Zodiac (2007), Conviction (2010), and Argo (2012).

On television, she played Sofie in Carnivàle (2003–2005), Audrey Hanson in Heroes (2006–2007), Wendy Peyser in American Horror Story: Asylum (2012–2013), Emma Borden in The Lizzie Borden Chronicles (2015), Lara Cruz in Better Call Saul (2015–2017), Marjorie in Veep (2016–2019), Sylvia in The Handmaid's Tale (2018–2022) and Elsa from HouseBroken (2021–present).

In 2016, DuVall made her feature directorial debut with The Intervention, which she also wrote and co-produced. Her next project as director was Happiest Season in 2020.

Early life
DuVall was born in Los Angeles, California. Her father, Steph DuVall, is also an actor. Her forename derives from the novel Clea by Lawrence Durrell. She once worked in a coffee shop and studied at the Los Angeles County High School for the Arts.

Career
DuVall made her debut in the low-budget horror film Little Witches (1996). This was followed by roles in several independent films and guest appearances on episodes of ER and Buffy the Vampire Slayer, before her breakthrough in 1998 as a goth high school student in Robert Rodriguez's The Faculty. She also had a supporting role in the cult teen comedy Can't Hardly Wait (1998), which included appearances by Jason Segel and Selma Blair before they were well-known.

In 1999, she had prominent roles in several films, including The Astronaut's Wife alongside Johnny Depp; Girl Interrupted opposite Winona Ryder; the hit romantic comedy She's All That; and the independent features Wildflowers and But I'm a Cheerleader. For her performance in Wildflowers, DuVall received rave reviews from critics. The latter film, in which she played a lesbian undergoing conversion therapy, has since developed a cult following and is often cited as a favorite among fans of LGBT cinema.

Over the next few years, DuVall had roles in a variety of films, including John Carpenter's Ghosts of Mars (2001); Thirteen Conversations About One Thing (2001) with Matthew McConaughey; The Laramie Project (2002); The Slaughter Rule (2002) with Ryan Gosling; Identity (2003); and the Academy Award-nominated 21 Grams (2003), opposite Sean Penn. She then appeared as part of the main cast of HBO's Carnivàle, which ran from 2003–05 and received several Creative Arts Emmy Awards. During that time, she also starred in the television film Helter Skelter (2004), which earned her a Satellite Award nomination for Best Actress, and in the box office hit The Grudge (2004), with Sarah Michelle Gellar.

Subsequent projects included a guest role on CSI: Crime Scene Investigation (2005); supporting roles in the films Two Weeks (2006), opposite Sally Field, and David Fincher's critically acclaimed Zodiac (2007); and a recurring character on NBC's popular science fiction series, Heroes (2006–2007).

Next, she appeared in the thrillers Anamorph (2007), with Willem Dafoe; Passengers (2008), with Anne Hathaway; and The Killing Room (2009), with Chloë Sevigny. This was followed by guest roles on Lie to Me (2009), Numb3rs, Bones, and Law & Order (all 2010).

In 2012, she co-starred in the film Argo, based on the Iran hostage crisis. DuVall played Cora Amburn-Lijek, one of the six American diplomats rescued from Iran in 1980. She, along with the rest of the Argo cast, received the 2013 Screen Actors Guild Award for Outstanding Performance by a Cast in a Motion Picture. Also in 2012, DuVall appeared in a recurring role on the second season of the FX anthology series American Horror Story, as Wendy Peyser.

In 2014, DuVall starred as Emma Borden, sister of Lizzie Borden (played by Christina Ricci), in the Lifetime television film, Lizzie Borden Took an Ax. She then reprised the role for the limited series The Lizzie Borden Chronicles (2015). The latter received mixed reviews, but critics praised the performances of Ricci and DuVall. Writing for The Hollywood Reporter, Keith Uhlich said the actresses "have a delectable rapport not too far removed from Bette Davis and Joan Crawford at their hag-horror peak in What Ever Happened to Baby Jane?"

In 2016, DuVall made her feature directorial debut with the comedy-drama The Intervention, which she also wrote, starred in, and produced. The film had its world premiere at the 2016 Sundance Film Festival and was later acquired by Paramount Pictures. The Intervention received positive reviews; Andy Webster of The New York Times noted that "DuVall juggles the emotional dynamics with fluid editing and light comic touches". The same year, she starred in the independent features Zen Dogs and Heaven's Floor, and guest starred on AMC's Better Call Saul.

From 2016 to 2019, she played Marjorie on the HBO series Veep, for which she was twice nominated—along with her co-stars—for the Screen Actors Guild Award for Outstanding Performance by an Ensemble in a Comedy Series, winning in 2018.

DuVall appeared in four episodes of the Hulu drama series The Handmaid's Tale in 2018 and 2019. She also starred in the independent comedy All About Nina, alongside Mary Elizabeth Winstead.

DuVall wrote and direct the 2020 film Happiest Season, which premiered on Hulu. The film, co-written by DuVall and Mary Holland, won the 2021 GLAAD Media Award for Outstanding Film – Wide Release.

Personal life
DuVall identifies as a lesbian and is married. She came out in 2016. DuVall also said that she was "very closeted" while making But I'm a Cheerleader.

Filmography

Film

Television

Awards and nominations

See also
 List of female film and television directors
 List of lesbian filmmakers
 List of LGBT-related films directed by women

References

External links

 
 
 

1977 births
Living people
20th-century American actresses
21st-century American actresses
American film actresses
American television actresses
American women film directors
American lesbian actresses
American lesbian artists
LGBT film directors
LGBT people from California
Actresses from Los Angeles
Outstanding Performance by a Cast in a Motion Picture Screen Actors Guild Award winners
Outstanding Performance by an Ensemble in a Comedy Series Screen Actors Guild Award winners
LGBT television directors
21st-century American LGBT people
American women television directors
American television directors